Virseq (also Romanized as Vīrseq; also known as Vīrseh and Vīrtheq) is a village in Dursun Khvajeh Rural District of the Central District of Nir County, Ardabil province, Iran. At the 2006 census, its population was 991 in 209 households. The following census in 2011 counted 993 people in 258 households. The latest census in 2016 showed a population of 827 people in 265 households; it was the largest village in its rural district.

References 

Nir County

Towns and villages in Nir County

Populated places in Ardabil Province

Populated places in Nir County